The yellow clown goby, Gobiodon okinawae, also known as the Okinawa goby or yellow coral goby, is a member of the goby family native to the western Pacific from southern Japan to the southern reaches of the Great Barrier Reef.  As the name implies, they are bright yellow in color, save for a whitish patch on each cheek.

Description
G. okinawae have a generally fusiform shape with seven dorsal spines, ten soft dorsal rays, one anal spine, and nine anal soft rays.  At maturity they can reach a length of 3.5 cm.

Another species, Gobiodon citrinus, the citrus goby, has a similar appearance to Gobiodon okinawae.  G. okinawae, however, lacks the requisite blue and white facial markings of G. citrinus.

These fish are not generally aggressive, though they can actively protect their territory against their own kind.  Their primary defense against predators is a poisonous, bitter mucus on their skin that makes them unpalatable.

Habitat

The yellow clown goby inhabits the coral reefs of sheltered lagoons.  Unlike most gobies, which are burrowers, Gobiodon sp. roost in the outer branches of Acropora (staghorn) corals, in groups of five to fifteen individuals.

Diet
Most gobies are carnivores, and the yellow clown goby is further subcategorized as a planktivore.  Given their small size, their diet consists mainly of mesoplankton.  
They are opportunistic feeders, not hunters. The typical eating behavior is to wait for food to come into range, at which point they dart out to grab it and then immediately return to their roost.

In the aquarium
The yellow clown goby is popular with aquarists and is generally considered to be reef safe.  It is especially suited to nano reef tanks because of its small size, and the ability of the aquarist to closely monitor its health. Equally bright as their coloration is their personality; they are valued additions to reef aquaria, with a reputation for being friendly and entertaining.

Because of territorial issues with their own kind in the small confines of a tank, they are best kept singly or as a breeding pair.

Given host corals in which to "roost", these fish are a colorful and entertaining addition to reef tanks.  Many gobies become accustomed to their keepers, recognize their presence, and seem to beg for food.  Additionally, when perching in a favorite location, they seem to do a "fish dance" where they wiggle back and forth in an undulating motion while waving their fins.

Many of these fish arrive at retailers in emaciated condition and are slow or finicky eaters. They often starve in the presence of more voracious feeders, such as wrasses.  Care must be taken to ensure they start eating within one or two days of acquisition.

They are carnivorous and initially do not readily take flake or pellet foods, instead preferring live or frozen.  Suggested foods include live brine shrimp fortified with phytoplankton to boost nutritional value, Zooplankton, frozen or live mysis shrimp, and finely chopped silversides (a commonly available small fish sold fresh or frozen).  This animal, like many other marine species, requires a varied diet to survive in long term captivity.  Regular feeding of at least four kinds of foods is recommended.

Conservation status
The yellow clown goby is not found on the IUCN Red List.  The species is highly resilient, with localized populations able to double within fifteen months.

Reproduction
Gobiodon sp. start life as females, and are bi-directional protogynous hermaphrodites, meaning that when paired up, if they are both of the same sex, one changes sex to form a breeding pair.  In the case of two females forming a pair, the larger of the two becomes male, and in the case of two males, the smaller changes sex to become female.  The only time a male is smaller than a female is when a small male is placed in the same coral as a large female.

The eggs are laid in circular bands around coral branches in masses of up to a thousand. The male will immediately fertilize them and guard until hatching, about five days later.  At about day 33, the fry undergo metamorphosis and begin to settle.  Coloration can be seen at about day 40.

References

External links
 

Gobiodon
Fish described in 1972